Francis Daneil "Buck" Watts (born 9 November 1944) is a Canadian politician serving as the Speaker of the Legislative Assembly of Prince Edward Island.

He was elected to the Legislative Assembly of Prince Edward Island in the 2007 provincial election, and represented the electoral district of Tracadie-Hillsborough Park and is a member of the Liberal Party until 2019.

On June 3, 2015, Watts was elected through a secret ballot after two rounds, as Speaker of the Legislative Assembly.

References

External links
 Biography at Legislative Assembly of Prince Edward Island website

Living people
People from Queens County, Prince Edward Island
Prince Edward Island Liberal Party MLAs
1944 births
21st-century Canadian politicians
Speakers of the Legislative Assembly of Prince Edward Island